Pancreatic enzymes, also known as pancreases or pancrelipase and pancreatin, are commercial mixtures of amylase, lipase, and protease. They are used to treat malabsorption syndrome due to certain pancreatic problems. These pancreatic problems may be due to cystic fibrosis, surgical removal of the pancreas, long term pancreatitis, or pancreatic cancer, among others. The preparation is taken by mouth.

Common side effects include vomiting, abdominal pain, constipation, and diarrhea. Other side effects include perianal irritation and high blood uric acid. The enzymes are from pigs. Use is believed to be safe during pregnancy. The components are digestive enzymes similar to those normally produced by the human pancreas. They help the person digest fats, starches, and proteins.

Pancreatic enzymes have been used as medications since at least the 1800s. They are on the World Health Organization's List of Essential Medicines. In 2020, it was the 262nd most commonly prescribed medication in the United States, with more than 1million prescriptions.

Medical uses
Pancrelipases are generally a first line approach in treatment of exocrine pancreatic insufficiency and other digestive disorders, accompanying cystic fibrosis, complicating surgical pancreatectomy, or resulting from chronic pancreatitis. The formulations are generally hard capsules filled with gastro-resistant granules. Pancrelipases and pancreatins are similar, except pancrelipases has an increased lipase component.

Pancreatin is a mixture of several digestive enzymes produced by the exocrine cells of the pancreas. It is composed of amylase, lipase and protease. This mixture is used to treat conditions in which pancreatic secretions are deficient, such as surgical pancreatectomy, pancreatitis and cystic fibrosis. It has been claimed to help with food allergies, celiac disease, autoimmune disease, cancer and weight loss. Pancreatin is sometimes called "pancreatic acid", although it is neither a single chemical substance nor an acid.

Pancreatin contains the pancreatic enzymes trypsin, amylase and lipase. A similar mixture of enzymes is sold as pancrelipase, which contains more active lipase enzyme than does pancreatin. The trypsin found in pancreatin works to hydrolyze proteins into oligopeptides; amylase hydrolyzes starches into oligosaccharides and the disaccharide maltose; and lipase hydrolyzes triglycerides into fatty acids and glycerols. Pancreatin is an effective enzyme supplement for replacing missing pancreatic enzymes, and aids in the digestion of foods in cases of pancreatic insufficiency.

Pancreatin reduces the absorption of iron from food in the duodenum during digestion.

Some contact lens-cleaning solutions contain porcine pancreatin extractives to assist in the intended protein-removal process.

Side effects 
High doses over a long period of time are associated with fibrosing colonopathy. Due to this association a maximum dose of 10,000 IU of lipase per kilogram per day is recommended.

Though never reported there is a theoretical risk of a viral infection as they are from pigs.

Society and culture

Brand names 
Brand names include Creon, Pancreaze, Pertzye, Sollpura (Liprotamase), Ultresa, and Zenpep.

Legal status

United States 
Longstanding pancreatic enzyme replacement products (PERPs)—some in use for a century or more—fell under a 2006 FDA requirement that pharmaceutical companies with porcine-derived PERP products submit a New Drug Application (NDA) for each; Creon (AbbVie Inc.), the first of the commercial PERP products approved after the FDA directive, reached market in 2009.

The specific requirement and reasoning for the FDA directive was that manufacturers submit a Risk Evaluation and Mitigation Strategy (REMS) and Medication Guide to ensure patients are adequately informed regarding potential risks associated with administration of high doses of porcine-derived PERP products, especially with regard to "the theoretical risk of transmission of viral disease from pigs to patients", the risk of which (alongside other off-target effects) is reduced by patient adherence to label dosing instructions.

Shortages and alternatives 
Due to its non-constant supply, being sourced from pigs, there have been several pancreatin shortages in different markets.

This has led for alternative sources of enzymes to be studied and commercialised, mainly being of bacterial or fungal origin.

Notes

References

Enzymes
AbbVie brands
World Health Organization essential medicines
Wikipedia medicine articles ready to translate
Enzymes used as drugs